Jeff Stone (born January 30, 1956) is an American politician and pharmacist who served as a member of the California State Senate from 2014 to 2019 and is serving as a member of the Nevada State Senate since 2022. A member of the Republican Party, Stone represented the 28th district, encompassing parts of Riverside County. Prior to his 2014 election to the state senate, he was a Riverside County Supervisor. Stone stepped down from the Senate in 2019 after being nominated Western Regional Director of the United States Department of Labor by President Donald Trump. After his federal position ended in 2021, he became a full-time resident of Nevada and now represents the Nevada's 20th Senate district.

Early life and education 
Stone was born and raised in Los Angeles County, California. He earned a Doctor of Pharmacy degree from the USC School of Pharmacy.

Career 
After earning his pharmacy degree, Stone relocated to Temecula, California and opened a small business. He served as a member of the Temecula City Council before being elected to the Riverside County Board of Supervisors.

In the 2014 general election, he defeated former Assemblywoman Bonnie Garcia, another Republican. Stone is Jewish.  He was the only Republican member of the California Legislative Jewish Caucus until he resigned from the caucus, saying it was preoccupied with criticizing President Donald Trump.  He resigned the same day the Jewish Caucus released a statement condemning President Trump's response to the white supremacist Unite the Right rally in Charlottesville.

In 2016, Stone was the Republican nominee for California's 36th congressional district, but he lost the general election to Raul Ruiz by a wide margin. He was narrowly re-elected to the Senate in 2018. He resigned on November 1, 2019, after accepting an appointment with the U.S. Department of Labor to become its Western Regional Director.]]. After a special election held on May 13, 2020, Stone was succeeded in the State Senate by Republican Assemblywoman, Melissa Melendez. Stone's time at the Department of Labor ended on January 20, 2021.

Stone had previously purchased a home in Henderson, Nevada. In 2022, he announced his candidacy for Nevada's 20th state Senate district. Following his successful election, Stone became a Nevada Senator in November 2022 encompassing the southeastern corner of the state.

References

External links 
 
 California Jeff Stone biography
 

University of Southern California alumni
Mayors of places in California
County supervisors in California
Republican Party California state senators
Republican Party Nevada state senators
Living people
People from Temecula, California
People from Henderson, Nevada
Candidates in the 2016 United States elections
21st-century American politicians
Jewish American state legislators in California
1956 births
Jewish mayors of places in the United States
21st-century American Jews